Witter is a surname. Notable people with the surname include:

Cherie Witter (born 1963), American model and actress; Playboy Playmate 1985
Daniel Witter (died 1675), Irish-Anglican priest
Daniel P. Witter (1852–1930), New York politician
Dean G. Witter (1887–1969), American businessman; founder of Dean Witter & Co.
Franklyn Witter (born 1959), Jamaican politician
George H. Witter (1854–1913), American physician and politician 
Isaac P. Witter (1873–1942), American politician
John Franklin Witter (1906-1982), American veterinarian and academic
Jim Witter (born 1964), Canadian country music and Christian music singer and songwriter
Junior Witter (born 1974), English professional boxer
Karen Witter (born 1961), American model and actress
Lisa Witter (born 1973), author
Nordia Coco Witter (1981), Jamaican musician
Ray Witter (1896–1983), American football player
Rick Witter (born 1972), English singer and songwriter
Tony Witter (born 1965), English professional football player
Wendy Witter (born 1936), English public servant and charity worker

Fictional characters
Doug Witter, in the television series Dawson's Creek
Pacey Witter, in the television series Dawson's Creek

See also
George Witters (1876–1934), New Zealand farmer, horticulturist and conservationist